Carolyn Thompson is an American former Texas Tech basketball player, playing from 1980 to 1984. She was born in Hobbs, New Mexico.

With a career total of 2,655 points, Thompson is the all-time leading scorer for the Texas Tech Lady Raiders and is ranked second in points per game with 21.9 (as of the end of the 2007 season). She set a total of eighteen records at Tech, including field goals made (1,013), field goal attempts (1,944), and  rebounds (1,247). In each of her four seasons at the school, she scored at least 600 points. Her best scoring season was during her senior year when she recorded 707 points.

Thompson is one of only three Lady Raiders to have her jersey retired. The others are Sheryl Swoopes and Krista Kirkland-Gerlich.

In 2014, Thompson was inducted into the Southwest Conference hall of Fame.

Texas Tech statistics
Source

See also
 List of NCAA Division I women's basketball players with 2,500 points and 1,000 rebounds

References

Year of birth missing (living people)
Living people
American women's basketball players
Power forwards (basketball)
Texas Tech Lady Raiders basketball players